Cookson is an English surname. Notable people with the surname include:

Brian Cookson (born 1951), British cyclist, and president of British Cycling
Edgar Christopher Cookson (1883–1915), British naval officer, awarded the Victoria Cross
Dame Catherine Cookson (1906–1998), English romance novelist
Harry Cookson  (1869–1922),  English footballer
Isaac Cookson (1679–1743), English industrialist, founder of the Cookson Group
Oliver Cookson (born 1979), British entrepreneur, founder of Myprotein
Peter Cookson (1913–1990), American  movie actor
Phil Cookson, English rugby league footballer of the 1960s and 1970s
Rob Cookson (born 1961), Canadian professional ice hockey coach
Sam Cookson (English footballer) (1896–1955)
Sam Cookson (Welsh footballer) (born 1891)
Walter Cookson (1879–1948), English footballer

See also
Cookson, Oklahoma, rural community in the Cookson Hills of Cherokee County, Oklahoma, United States
Cookson Hills, Oklahoma, part of The Ozarks
Cookson Group, a British industrial materials and processes company